KQIS (1340 kHz) is an AM radio station licensed to serve the community of Bethel Heights, Arkansas. The station is owned by Perry Publishing and Broadcasting, through licensee Perry Broadcasting of Arkansas, Inc. It airs a mainstream urban radio format.

History

KBRS
The station signed on the air on September 10, 1949, under the call sign KBRS licensed in Springdale, featuring programming from the ABC Radio Network as well as St. Louis Cardinals baseball and Arkansas Razorbacks college games. The station in its later years ran a MOR format, and later adult contemporary in the mid-1980s. KBRS ceased operations in May 1992 following a license revoke.

KFMD & KQIS
After two decades of the frequency being off-the-air, the station relaunched under a different license location and assigned the call sign KFMD by the Federal Communications Commission on December 13, 2012. The station changed its call sign to KQIS on December 31, 2015.

References

External links
 
 
 
 

QIS (AM)
Radio stations established in 1949
1992 disestablishments in Arkansas
Radio stations established in 2013
2013 establishments in Arkansas
Mainstream urban radio stations in the United States
Benton County, Arkansas